Radiant is a French manga (manfra) series written and illustrated by Tony Valente. It has been published by Ankama since 2013 and has 17 volumes released in French as of December 2022. It was later published by the Japanese publisher Asukashinsha in 2015, making it the first manfra to be published in Japan. The series has been licensed by Viz Media in English since 2018 and has 16 volumes released. The series received an anime television series adaptation by Lerche that aired from October 2018 to February 2019, followed by a second season aired from October 2019 to February 2020.

Plot
In the world of “El Pharenos”, a race of powerful monsters called Nemeses fall from the sky. This race infects every living thing they touch. Any humans who survive their contact become cursed, but also gain the ability to wield the magic power known as "Fantasia", thus becoming Sorcerers. Some Sorcerers use their powers for their own gain while others choose to become heroes and protect normal humans from the Nemeses. But whether good or evil, all Sorcerers are mostly treated with fear and contempt by the common folk. There is also an organization known as the Inquisition, which is dedicated to the eradication of Sorcerers.

The series follows Seth, a 15-year-old boy who has survived a Nemesis attack. He dreams of defeating all of the Nemeses and bringing peace between Sorcerers and the rest of humanity. To do so, he has to find the place where the Nemeses come from, the legendary Radiant, and destroy it. He and other sorcerers travel the region in search of Radiant whilst avoiding the Inquisition.

Characters

Main characters

A fifteen-year-old boy that wants to become a powerful sorcerer. He aspires to end the Nemesis threat and bring peace to the Sorcerers and humans.

A girl with a unique curse, cool broomstick and an important friend to Seth.

A cowardly researcher that Mélie works for and becomes great friends with Seth.

 
 A small Nemesis and Mélie's closest companion.

An apprentice of the Order of the Knight-Sorcerers of Cyfandir, Ocoho becomes a princess upon becoming Queen Boudica's heir, and starts traveling with Seth in search of the Radiant. Ocoho's curse is a mark just below the ear, when touched she obeys the commands of the person touching it, and does not have memories of what she did. She rides a racoon/dragon named Draccoon.

Allies

A woman who is an experienced Sorcerer and Nemesis Hunter. She survived the same Nemesis attack Seth survived from ten years ago, losing her right arm. She since raised Seth and teaches him on controlling his Sorcerer powers. Although she acts somewhat hostile towards him, she is shown to be very caring and greatly knows how to use kindness to people.

 The tailed leader of the Bravery Quartet.

A mysterious and powerful Sorcerer covered in bandages head to toe and speaks in the third-person.

An talking cat-like being that is the leader of the Artemis Institute. 

A wise, elderly sorcerer who was Alma's mentor. He becomes Seth's mentor as well.

A woman whose father is a puppet on her right hand. Doc has a crush on her, but her father is too controlling.
Hameline

A Domitor Sorceress who can control a horde of Nemesis with her magic.

Ruler of Caislean Merlin on the continent of Cyfandir, Queen Boudica has an infection that caused her to grow five times the size of an ordinary human being, making her a giantess. She becomes the surrogate mother of Myr and Yggdrajill's children, and names Ocoho as her heir.

A member of the Knight-sorcerers who tries to flirt with Mélie, tricked into working for the baron-merchants. Following the battle with the Inquisition, de Gulis is jailed for suspicion of conspiracy.

An old classmate of Ocoho's, tricked into working for the baron-merchants. Murdered by Mordred following the former's betrayal.
Myrddin / 

A pixie/human hybrid who lives at Caislean Merlin. He has the ability to see and control the flow of Fantasia around. He is married to Jill.
Yggdrajill / 

Wife of Myr and daughter of Yggdrasil, Yggdrajill, or Jill for short, is a giant dryad who helps teach Seth how to control his inner darkness. Together with Myr, she had children due to be born. Following her death though, Queen Boudica volunteered to carry Myr and Jill's children, becoming their surrogate mother.
Diabal

A boy with two horns like Seth.
Triton

A man who like Seth and Diabal, has two horns.
Narrator

Inquisition
The Inquisition is based in Bome, the capital of the Estrie Kingdoms, which includes Convictis. Their flagship is the Battle Airship Uranos.

A captain of the Inquisition tasked with bringing in Seth alive. Questions the Inquisitions mission.

The main antagonist of the series, he is the general of the Inquisition. Also known as "The Beast".

A mysterious young man that appears to be Seth's older brother.
Vérone
 
Prince of the Convictis.
 

The corrupt prime official for the islet of Rumble Town.

Baron Merchants
The Baron Merchants are natives of the Pontanian States, known to be business savvy and are technological innovators. They planned to enslave the infected people of Cyfandir.

Mordred's father.

A chubby member of the Baron Merchants.

A swordsman who fights with Lord de Gulis.

Posing as an honorable member of the Knight-sorcerer candidates, it's revealed that his father is a baron merchant who sent him as a spy in a bid to claim Cyfandir's land, and a member of the Faithful of the Hermit.

Media

Manga

The manga is written and illustrated by French author Tony Valente. He began the publication of Radiant on Ankama Éditions in July 2013 and currently has 17 volumes released. According to an interview that he made in Just Focus at April 2014, Tony says that his inspirations to create Radiant were Fairy Tail, Naruto, and One Piece. It has been published by Viz Media in English since 2018. 

The series is published in Japan by Asukashinsha. Additional languages it has been published in are Spanish by LetraBlanka since 2016, German by Pyramond since 2016, Italian by Mangasenpai since 2017, Serbian by Najkula since 2022 and Swedish by Cobolt Förlag since 2022.

Anime

NHK announced the series on January 31, 2018. The series is directed by Seiji Kishi and Daisei Fukuoka, and written by Makoto Uezu, with animation done in RETAS software by Nerima-based studio Lerche. Character designs for the series are produced by Nozomi Kawano, and Masato Koda is composing the series' music. The opening theme is "Utopia" by 04 Limited Sazabys, while the ending theme is "Radiant" by Polkadot Stingray.

The 21-episode anime series aired on NHK Educational TV from October 6, 2018, to February 23, 2019. It is based on volumes 1 through 4 of the comic. The series is simulcast by Crunchyroll, with Funimation producing an English dub as it airs.

In the season finale, a 21-episode second season has been announced. It premiered on October 2, 2019. The opening theme is "Naraku" by Halo at Yojohan, while the ending theme is "Chitto mo Shiranakatta" by Emi Nakamura.
 
The series received a French dub which first aired on Game One in France on September 2, 2019.

The anime began airing on ABC Me in Australia on January 2, 2021.

References

External links
Official French Manfra website
Official English Manfra website
Official Japanese Manfra website 
 

2013 manga
Adventure anime and manga
Anime based on comics
Anime series based on manga
Crunchyroll anime
Fantasy anime and manga
Funimation
Lerche (studio)
NHK original programming
Shōnen manga
Television shows written by Makoto Uezu
Viz Media manga